In mathematics, even functions and odd functions are functions which satisfy particular symmetry relations, with respect to taking additive inverses. They are important in many areas of mathematical analysis, especially the theory of power series and Fourier series. They are named for the parity of the powers of the power functions which satisfy each condition: the function  is an even function if n is an even integer, and it is an odd function if n is an odd  integer.

Definition and examples

Evenness and oddness are generally considered for real functions, that is real-valued functions of a real variable. However, the concepts may be more generally defined for functions whose domain and codomain both have a notion of additive inverse. This includes abelian groups, all rings, all fields, and all vector spaces. Thus, for example, a real function could be odd or even (or neither), as could a complex-valued function of a vector variable, and so on.

The given examples are real functions, to illustrate the symmetry of their graphs.

Even functions

Let f be a real-valued function of a real variable. Then f is even if the following equation holds for all x such that x and −x are in the domain of f:

or equivalently if the following equation holds for all such x:

Geometrically, the graph of an even function is symmetric with respect to the y-axis, meaning that its graph remains unchanged after reflection about the y-axis.

Examples of even functions are:
The absolute value 

cosine 
hyperbolic cosine

Odd functions

Again, let f be a real-valued function of a real variable. Then f is odd if the following equation holds for all x such that x and −x are in the domain of f:

or equivalently if the following equation holds for all such x:

Geometrically, the graph of an odd function has rotational symmetry with respect to the origin, meaning that its graph remains unchanged after rotation of 180 degrees about the origin.

Examples of odd functions are:
The identity function 

sine 
hyperbolic sine 
The error function

Basic properties

Uniqueness
 If a function is both even and odd, it is equal to 0 everywhere it is defined.
 If a function is odd, the absolute value of that function is an even function.

Addition and subtraction
 The sum of two even functions is even.
 The sum of two odd functions is odd.
 The difference between two odd functions is odd.
 The difference between two even functions is even.
 The sum of an even and odd function is not even or odd, unless one of the functions is equal to zero over the given domain.

Multiplication and division
 The product of two even functions is an even function.
 That implies that product of any number of even functions is an even function as well.
 The product of two odd functions is an even function.
 The product of an even function and an odd function is an odd function.
 The quotient of two even functions is an even function.
 The quotient of two odd functions is an even function.
 The quotient of an even function and an odd function is an odd function.

Composition
 The composition of two even functions is even.
 The composition of two odd functions is odd.
 The composition of an even function and an odd function is even.
 The composition of any function with an even function is even (but not vice versa).

Even–odd decomposition
Every function may be uniquely decomposed as the sum of an even and an odd function, which are called respectively the even part and the odd part of the function; if one defines

and

then  is even,  is odd, and
 

Conversely, if

 

For example, the hyperbolic cosine and the hyperbolic sine may be regarded as the even and odd parts of the exponential function, as the first one is an even function, the second one is odd, and 
.

Further algebraic properties
 Any linear combination of even functions is even, and the even functions form a vector space over the reals. Similarly, any linear combination of odd functions is odd, and the odd functions also form a vector space over the reals. In fact, the vector space of all real functions is the direct sum of the subspaces of even and odd functions. This is a more abstract way of expressing the property in the preceding section.
The space of functions can be considered a graded algebra over the real numbers by this property, as well as some of those above.

The even functions form a commutative algebra over the reals. However, the odd functions do not form an algebra over the reals, as they are not closed under multiplication.

Analytic properties

A function's being odd or even does not imply differentiability, or even continuity. For example, the Dirichlet function is even, but is nowhere continuous. 

In the following, properties involving derivatives, Fourier series, Taylor series, and so on suppose that these concepts are defined of the functions that are considered.

Basic analytic properties
 The derivative of an even function is odd. 
 The derivative of an odd function is even.
 The integral of an odd function from −A to +A is zero (where A is finite, and the function has no vertical asymptotes between −A and A).  For an odd function that is integrable over a symmetric interval, e.g. , the result of the integral over that interval is zero; that is
.
 The integral of an even function from −A to +A is twice the integral from 0 to +A (where A is finite, and the function has no vertical asymptotes between −A and A.  This also holds true when A is infinite, but only if the integral converges); that is 
.

Series
 The Maclaurin series of an even function includes only even powers.
 The Maclaurin series of an odd function includes only odd powers.
 The Fourier series of a periodic even function includes only cosine terms.
 The Fourier series of a periodic odd function includes only sine terms.
The Fourier transform of a purely real-valued even function is real and even. (see )
The Fourier transform of a purely real-valued odd function is imaginary and odd. (see )

Harmonics
In signal processing, harmonic distortion occurs when a sine wave signal is sent through a memory-less nonlinear system, that is, a system whose output at time t only depends on the input at time t and does not depend on the input at any previous times. Such a system is described by a response function . The type of harmonics produced depend on the response function f:
 When the response function is even, the resulting signal will consist of only even harmonics of the input sine wave; 
 The fundamental is also an odd harmonic, so will not be present.
 A simple example is a full-wave rectifier.
 The  component represents the DC offset, due to the one-sided nature of even-symmetric transfer functions.
 When it is odd, the resulting signal will consist of only odd harmonics of the input sine wave; 
 The output signal will be half-wave symmetric.
 A simple example is clipping in a symmetric push-pull amplifier.
 When it is asymmetric, the resulting signal may contain either even or odd harmonics; 
 Simple examples are a half-wave rectifier, and clipping in an asymmetrical class-A amplifier.

Note that this does not hold true for more complex waveforms.  A sawtooth wave contains both even and odd harmonics, for instance.  After even-symmetric full-wave rectification, it becomes a triangle wave, which, other than the DC offset, contains only odd harmonics.

Generalizations

Multivariate functions

Even symmetry:

A function  is called even symmetric if:

Odd symmetry:

A function  is called odd symmetric if:

Complex-valued functions
The definitions for even and odd symmetry for complex-valued functions of a real argument are similar to the real case but involve complex conjugation.

Even symmetry:

A complex-valued function of a real argument  is called even symmetric if:

Odd symmetry:

A complex-valued function of a real argument  is called odd symmetric if:

Finite length sequences
The definitions of odd and even symmetry are extended to N-point sequences (i.e. functions of the form ) as follows:

Even symmetry:

A N-point sequence is called even symmetric if

Such a sequence is often called a palindromic sequence; see also Palindromic polynomial.

Odd symmetry:

A N-point sequence is called odd symmetric if

Such a sequence is sometimes called an anti-palindromic sequence; see also Antipalindromic polynomial.

See also
Hermitian function for a generalization in complex numbers
Taylor series
Fourier series
Holstein–Herring method
Parity (physics)

Notes

References

Calculus
Parity (mathematics)
Types of functions